Vietbocap canhi is a species of troglobiontic scorpions in the family Pseudochactidae native to Vietnam.

References 

Pseudochactidae
Scorpions of Asia
Arthropods of Vietnam
Endemic fauna of Vietnam
Animals described in 2010
Taxa named by Wilson R. Lourenço